The 1944–45 Copa México is the 29th staging of the Copa México, a Mexican football cup competition that existed from 1907 to 1997, but the 2nd staging in the professional era.

The competition started on June 3, 1945, and concluded on June 24, 1945, with the Final, held at the Parque Asturias in México DF, in which Puebla lifted the trophy for the first time ever with a 6–4 victory over América.

Final phase

First leg:

Second leg:

Semi-final

 América bye to Final

Final

References
Mexico - Statistics of Copa México in season 1944/1945. (RSSSF)

Copa MX
Copa
1944–45 domestic association football cups